General Atomic and Molecular Electronic Structure System (GAMESS-UK) is a computer software program for computational chemistry. The original code split in 1981 into GAMESS-UK and GAMESS (US) variants, which now differ significantly. Many of the early developments in the UK version arose from the earlier UK based ATMOL program, which, unlike GAMESS, lacked analytical gradients for geometry optimisation.

GAMESS-UK can perform many general computational chemistry calculations, including Hartree–Fock method, Møller–Plesset perturbation theory (MP2 & MP3), coupled cluster (CCSD & CCSD(T)), density functional theory (DFT), configuration interaction (CI), and other advanced electronic structure methods. Calculation of valence bond wave functions are possible by the TURTLE code, due to J. H. van Lenthe.

See also
 CP2K
 GAMESS (US)
 Gaussian (software)
 MOLCAS
 MOLPRO
 MPQC
 NWChem
 PSI (computational chemistry) (Psi3)
 Firefly (computer program)
 Q-Chem
 Quantum chemistry computer programs

References
  This is one of the most cited chemistry papers

External links 
 

Computational chemistry software
Science and Technology Facilities Council
Science and technology in Cheshire

pl:GAMESS